Call is a surname. Notable people with the surname include:

Alex Call (born 1994), American baseball player
Ann Lowdon Call (1945–2007), horsewoman
Annie Payson Call (1853-1940), American author
Anson Call (1810–1890), Mormon pioneer and colonizer of the Utah Territory
Brandon Call (born 1976), American television and film actor 
Emma Louise Call (1847-1937), American physician 
Evan Call (born 1988), American composer
Sir John Call, 1st Baronet (1731–1801), English engineer and baronet
Ramon Malla Call (1922–2014), Bishop of Lleida, Andorra
R. D. Call (born 1950), American film and television actor
Richard K. Call (1792–1862), territorial governor of Florida
Wilkinson Call (1834–1910), US senator from Florida

Fictional characters
Annalee Call, the android portrayed by Winona Ryder in Alien: Resurrection
Woodrow F. Call, a Texas Ranger who appears in all four books of Larry McMurtry's Lonesome Dove series

See also

Calla (name)
Calle (name)